The 2015 Chattogram City Corporation election was held on 30 April 2015. A total of 12 candidates ran for mayor. The result was a victory for the Awami League candidate A J M Nasir Uddin. However, the results were rejected by main opposition candidate, Mohammad Manjur Alam of the Bangladesh Nationalist Party.

Results

References

2015 elections in Bangladesh
2015 in Bangladesh
Local elections in Bangladesh
Elections in Chittagong
April 2015 events in Bangladesh